Pentrepiod ( - 'Magpie Village') railway station is a small unstaffed railway halt on the Bala Lake Railway alongside the B4403. Trains will stop here by request only, and the station can only be accessed by means of footpaths around the lake. The station has a short platform (one coach length only) and a station name board and is situated on the east side of a private crossing. There are no station buildings.

History
The Bala Lake Railway opened in August 1972, with Pentrepiod as the eastern terminus of the line. The station retained this position until the start of the 1973 operating season, by which time the first extension (to Llangower) had been opened.

Neighbouring stations

External links
 site of Pentrepiod station on navigable 1946 O.S. map (station not shown)

Heritage railway stations in Gwynedd
Llangywer
Railway stations in Great Britain opened in 1972